JSON-WSP is a web service protocol that uses JSON for service description, requests and responses. It is inspired from JSON-RPC, but the lack of a service description specification with documentation in JSON-RPC sparked the design of JSON-WSP.

The description format has the same purpose for JSON-WSP as WSDL has for SOAP or IDL for CORBA, which is to describe the types and methods used in a given service. It also describes inter-type relations (i.e. nested types) and defines which types are expected as method arguments and which types the user can expect to receive as method return values. Finally the description opens the possibility to add documentation on service, method, parameter and return levels.

Communication between clients and a JSON-WSP server is carried out using HTTP POST requests and responses, with the JSON objects as data with the content-type application/json.

Specifications 

JSON-WSP consists of four JSON object specifications:

References 

Web services
Web service specifications
Remote procedure call
JSON

better information https://en.wikipedia.org/w/index.php?oldid=757972316